Watlington House is a 17th-century building, with a large walled garden, in the town of Reading in the English county of Berkshire. The building is brick built and is reputed to be the oldest surviving secular building in the town. It is a listed building, being listed grade II*.
The information on the Historic England website is https://historicengland.org.uk/listing/the-list/list-entry/1321898

The western or rear part of the building was built in 1688 for Samuel and Anne Watlington, whilst the eastern part, fronting onto Watlington Street, is said to date from 1763. Samuel Watlington served as mayor of Reading in 1695 and again in 1711.

The first recorded occupant of the house was Captain Edward Purvis in 1794, renting the house for £25 annually. He fought at the Battle of Corunna in the Peninsular War with the 4th Regiment of Foot and trained the Berkshire Militia in Orts meadow near his home. The house is rumoured to be haunted by his ghost. After Captain Purvis, the house was variously occupied by a Mrs Stevens and then used as an office by the town clerk of Reading.

In 1877 the house became the first home of the newly founded Kendrick Girls School. The school remained on the site until 1927, when they moved to their current location on the corner of Sidmouth Street and London Road. During their stay they erected a corrugated iron hall in the garden, which still stands.

Since 1931, the building has been owned by local trustees. They provide accommodation for social and educational organisations, using the rents for the upkeep of Watlington House.

Since 2003, the House has been the home of the Mills Archive, the national repository for documents, images and other records on mills, milling and the historical uses of traditional power sources along with other tenants.  As at 2021 there are 5 tenants of the house, including The Mills Archive, Weston Architects, Berkshire Youth. the Reserve Forces Employment Association (MOD) and Total Security Corps (a Nepalese group which provides training in the Security industry).

The Garden Hall has been used by local groups for purposes such as; Yoga, Dance, Keep fit.  Parties and Weddings celebrations have also been held.   There is also now a separate small meeting room available to hire.

In May 2020 Trustees agreed to improve the presence of the building as it faces Watlington Street by erecting a perimeter wall and railings and a central gate.  This will reflect, but not copy, the wall and central gate which is known to have been in situ in the 1920s. Completion is expected August 2021.

In January 2021 the Garden Hall started to be used for the Coronavirus Vaccination Programme by 2 Primary Care Networks (Reading Central and Whitley).  It is expected that this will continue until the late autumn with the Booster Jabs and the Flu vaccinations.

Further information is available on the website.  http://www.watlingtonhouse.org.uk/about

References

External links

Watlington House official web site

Grade II* listed buildings in Reading
Houses completed in 1688
1688 establishments in England